The 2004-05 Premier Reserve League season was the sixth since its establishment and featured 15 teams in the Northern League - won by Manchester United Reserves - and 15 teams in the Southern League - won by Charlton Athletic Reserves.

League table 
Reserve League North

Reserve League South

Pld = Matches played; W = Matches won; D = Matches drawn; L = Matches lost; F = Goals for; A = Goals against; GD = Goal difference; Pts = Points

See also 
 2005-06 in English football
 FA Premier League 2004-05

External links 
 Official Premier League site

Premier Reserve League
Reserve League, 2004-05
Reserve